County Line is an American action Western film which was released in 2018. The film aired on INSP on May 5, 2018. Two sequels were announced, with County Line: All In airing in 2022.

Plot
County Line follows Alden Rockwell, a former sheriff played by Tom Wopat. The sheriff is left with many unanswered questions when his best friend, Clint Thorne, a fellow sheriff in a neighboring county is gunned down. Jeff Fahey stars as the gunned down Sheriff Thorne.

Following his death an investigation is opened by Grant Goodeve's character, Sheriff Preston. The investigation fails to follow any logical route and ultimately results in the case going cold, with some suggesting Sheriff Preston is turning a blind eye to the murder.

Alden refuses to accept that the death of his friend and fellow sheriff cannot be solved, and takes matters into his own hands.

Production 
Filming was on location in Toccoa, Georgia.

Main cast

Sequel & future films
In 2021, it was announced that both a sequel and third film were in production. The second instalment is expected to be released in 2022, with the title County Line: All In. The third film will be titled County Line: No Fear, which has an unknown release date. Tom Wopat will reprise his leading role as Alden Rockwell in both films.

References

External links

2010s English-language films
INSP Films
2020s Western (genre) films